On June 5, 1968, shortly after midnight, Robert F. Kennedy was shot by Sirhan Sirhan at the Ambassador Hotel in Los Angeles. He was pronounced dead at 1:44 a.m. PDT the following day.

Kennedy was a senator from New York and a candidate in the 1968 Democratic Party presidential primaries. On June 4, 1968, he won the California and South Dakota primary elections. He addressed his campaign supporters in the Ambassador Hotel's Embassy Room ballroom. After leaving the podium, and exiting through a kitchen hallway, he was mortally wounded by multiple shots fired by Sirhan. Kennedy died at Good Samaritan Hospital nearly 26 hours later. His body was buried at Arlington National Cemetery, near his brother John F. Kennedy's grave.

Sirhan was a Palestinian who held strong anti-Zionist and pro-Palestinian beliefs. In 1969, he testified that he killed Kennedy "with 20 years of malice aforethought"; he was convicted and sentenced to death. Due to the court case People v. Anderson, his sentence was commuted to life in prison in 1972 with a possibility of parole. As of January 2022, his parole request has been denied 16 times.

Kennedy's assassination prompted the Secret Service to protect presidential candidates. Hubert Humphrey became the Democratic nominee but ultimately lost the election to Republican candidate Richard Nixon. Kennedy's assassination has led to several conspiracy theories. No credible evidence has emerged that Sirhan was not the shooter, or that he did not act alone. It has been described as one of four major assassinations in the United States that occurred during the 1960s.

Background 
Robert F. Kennedy was born in Brookline, Massachusetts, in 1925. In 1948, he visited Palestine and wrote six dispatches for The Boston Post. He dismissed the possibility of the Jewish state becoming communist as "fantastically absurd", and called it the "only stabilizing factor remaining in the near and middle East". In 1960, John F. Kennedy, Robert's elder brother, was elected the president of the United States and appointed Robert as the attorney general. During his tenure, Robert served as John's close advisor and was associated with various decisions during the Kennedy administration. According to author Matthew A. Hayes, during the Cuban Missile Crisis, Robert acted as a "de-facto Chief of Staff, Presidential Agent and Intermediary for his brother" and was an "indispensable partner" in its successful resolution. In November 1963, President Kennedy was assassinated in Dallas, Texas, and Robert was deeply affected by it. Vice President Lyndon B. Johnson assumed the presidency and retained almost all prominent Kennedy advisors, including Robert as attorney general. Despite his political differences with Johnson, Robert Kennedy remained in the cabinet.

In 1964, polls showed that various Democrats wanted Kennedy to be Johnson's running mate in that year's presidential election. Kennedy instead organized his senatorial campaign in New York, challenging Kenneth Keating, an incumbent Republican senator. During a campaign speech, Kennedy declared his support for Israel, stating that in the event of an attack, "we will stand by Israel and come to her assistance". He won the election; during his congressional career, he supported civil rights and opposed Johnson's policies regarding the Vietnam War.

The 1968 presidential campaign has been referred to as one of the most volatile campaigns in American history. There was strong opposition to the ongoing Vietnam War; and it was a period of social unrest, with riots in major cities. Allard K. Lowenstein, a Democratic politician, organized a "Dump Johnson" movement to prevent Johnson's nomination as the presidential candidate, and asked Kennedy to run instead. Kennedy refused, asserting that he did not want to split the Democratic Party. Eugene McCarthy, a senator from Minnesota, then emerged as the leader of the "Dump Johnson" movement and entered several state presidential primaries. In late January 1968, the Tet Offensive in Vietnam, in the view of historian Lloyd Gardner, "shattered hopes that the war could be won within a reasonable period of time—if ever—and broke open the cracks in the Democratic coalition".

On March 12, 1968, in the New Hampshire Democratic primary election, McCarthy nearly defeated Johnson with 42 percent to Johnson's 49 percent of the votes. Four days later, Kennedy announced his presidential campaign. On March 31, Johnson announced that he would not seek the presidency. Four days later, civil rights activist Martin Luther King Jr. was assassinated, leading to further riots in several cities. The same day, Kennedy gave a speech in Indianapolis, Indiana, saying:

What we need in the United States is not division; what we need in the United States is not hatred; what we need in the United States is not violence and lawlessness, but is love, and wisdom, and compassion toward one another, and a feeling of justice toward those who still suffer within our country, whether they be white or whether they be black. ... let us dedicate ourselves to what the Greeks wrote so many years ago: to tame the savageness of man and make gentle the life of this world. Let us dedicate ourselves to that, and say a prayer for our country and for our people.

In April, Vice President Hubert Humphrey announced his candidacy for the presidency. He mostly avoided primaries and focused on states which held caucuses. Contrary to Kennedy, Humphrey did not publicly oppose the Vietnam War.

Assassination

California primary and shooting 

The California presidential primary elections were held on June 4, 1968. Polls by CBS showed Kennedy leading by 7 percent. The statewide results gave Kennedy 46 percent to McCarthy's 42 percent. Kennedy also won the South Dakota primary, winning approximately 50 percent of the vote. Author Joseph Palermo referred to the victory as Kennedy's "greatest". He was now in second place with  total delegates, against Humphrey's  delegates.

At approximately 12:02 a.m. PDT the next day, Kennedy addressed his campaign supporters in the Ambassador Hotel's Embassy Room ballroom in the Mid-Wilshire, Los Angeles. At the time, the government did not provide Secret Service protection for presidential candidates. Kennedy's only security personnel were former Federal Bureau of Investigation (FBI) agent William Barry and two unofficial bodyguards: Olympic decathlon gold medalist Rafer Johnson and former football player Rosey Grier. At approximately 12:10 a.m., concluding his victory speech, Kennedy said: "So my thanks to all of you and on to Chicago and let's win there." Kennedy planned to walk through the ballroom after speaking on his way to another gathering of supporters, but reporters wanted a press conference. Campaign aide Fred Dutton decided that Kennedy would forgo the second gathering and instead go through the hotel's kitchen and pantry area behind the ballroom to the press area. Kennedy had welcomed contact with the public during the campaign, and people had often tried to touch him in excitement. Soon after Kennedy concluded the speech, he started to exit through the ballroom when Barry stopped him and said, "No, it's been changed. We're going this way." Barry and Dutton began clearing a way for Kennedy to go left, through swinging doors, to the kitchen corridor, but he was hemmed in by the crowd and followed maître d'hôtel Karl Uecker through a back exit. Uecker led Kennedy through the kitchen area, holding his right wrist, but frequently releasing it as Kennedy shook hands with people whom he encountered. Uecker and Kennedy started down a passageway narrowed by an ice machine and a steam table in the north.

Kennedy turned to his left and shook hands with Juan Romero, just as Sirhan Sirhan stepped down from a low tray-stacker beside the ice-machine, rushed past Uecker, and repeatedly fired an eight-shot .22 Long Rifle caliber Iver Johnson Cadet 55-A revolver at point-blank range. Kennedy fell to the floor; others, including writer George Plimpton and Grier, tried to disarm Sirhan, as he continued firing his gun in random directions. Five other people were wounded: William Weisel of ABC News, Paul Schrade of the United Automobile Workers union, Democratic Party activist Elizabeth Evans, Ira Goldstein of the Continental News Service, and Kennedy campaign volunteer Irwin Stroll. A minute later, Sirhan wrestled free and grabbed the revolver again, but others grabbed him. Barry went to Kennedy and placed his jacket under Kennedy's head. As Kennedy lay wounded, Romero cradled his head and placed a rosary in his hand. Kennedy asked Romero, "Is everybody OK?"; Romero responded, "Yes, everybody's OK." Kennedy then turned away and said, "Everything's going to be OK." The moment was captured by Boris Yaro of the Los Angeles Times and became the iconic image of the assassination.

Immediate aftermath and death 
As the shooting took place, ABC News was signing off from its election-night broadcast, while the CBS coverage had been concluded. CBS went back on the air with coverage of the assassination 21 minutes after the shooting. ABC's associate news director Weisel, who was wounded during the shooting, reported from his stretcher. ABC was able to show scant live footage from the kitchen after Kennedy had been transported, but all of ABC's coverage from the hotel was in black-and-white. Approximately three hours after the incident, television networks began their morning broadcast schedule. About six million Western American households viewed the live reporting.

Kennedy's wife, Ethel, who was three months pregnant, had been away from the shooting scene. She was soon led to Kennedy and knelt beside him. Kennedy turned his head seeming to recognize her. Kennedy's campaign manager, Stephen Edward Smith, promptly appeared on television and asked for a doctor. After several minutes, medical attendants arrived and lifted Kennedy onto a stretcher, prompting him to whisper, "Don't lift me", which were his last words; he lost consciousness shortly after. He was taken to Central Receiving Hospital. A doctor slapped his face, calling, "Bob! Bob! Bob!" while another doctor massaged his heart. After obtaining a good heartbeat, doctors handed a stethoscope to Ethel so that she could hear Kennedy's heart beating. After about 30 minutes, Kennedy was transferred several blocks to the Good Samaritan Hospital to undergo surgery. A gymnasium near the hospital was set up as temporary headquarters for the press and news media to receive updates on his condition. Surgery began at 3:12 a.m. and lasted approximately 3 hours and 40 minutes. At 5:30 p.m. on Wednesday, spokesman Frank Mankiewicz announced that Kennedy's doctors were "concerned over his continuing failure to show improvement"; his condition was critical.

Kennedy had been shot multiple times. The other two shots entered at the rear of his right armpit; one exited from his chest and the other lodged in the back of his neck. Despite extensive neurosurgery to remove the bullet and bone fragments from his brain, he was pronounced dead at 1:44 a.m. on June 6, nearly 25 hours after the shooting. Mankiewicz left the hospital and walked to the gymnasium where the press and news media were set up for continuous updates on the situation. At 2 a.m. on June 6, Mankiewicz announced Kennedy's death. The following week, NBC devoted 55 hours to the shooting and its aftermath, ABC 43 hours, and CBS 42 hours, with all three networks initially pre-empting their regular coverage and advertisements to cover the story.

Funeral and aftermath 

Kennedy's remains were taken to New York City, where his casket was viewed by thousands at St. Patrick's Cathedral. The funeral mass was held on the morning of June 8. Kennedy's younger brother, Senator Ted Kennedy, delivered the eulogy, saying:

My brother need not be idealized, or enlarged in death beyond what he was in life; to be remembered simply as a good and decent man, who saw wrong and tried to right it, saw suffering and tried to heal it, saw war and tried to stop it ... As he said many times, in many parts of this nation, to those he touched and who sought to touch him: "Some men see things as they are and say why. I dream things that never were and say why not."

Kennedy's body was transported via train to Washington, D.C.; many mourners lined the route, paying their respects. On the way to the cemetery, the funeral procession passed through Resurrection City, a shantytown protest site. The procession stopped in front of the Lincoln Memorial, where residents of Resurrection City joined the group, and the "Battle Hymn of the Republic" was sung. Kennedy was buried near his older brother John in Arlington National Cemetery. This was the first burial to have ever taken place there at night. After the assassination, Congress altered the Secret Service's mandate to include protection for major presidential and vice-presidential nominees.

At the time of his death, Kennedy was substantially behind Humphrey in convention delegate support, but many believe that, following his victory in the California primary, he would have ultimately secured the nomination. Humphrey won the nomination at the convention in Chicago, at which violence in the streets occurred. He ultimately lost the general election to Republican candidate Richard Nixon by a narrow popular vote margin of 0.7 percent. Nixon won by a more decisive 301–191 margin in the electoral vote.

Perpetrator 

Sirhan Sirhan was born on March 19, 1944, in Jerusalem, Palestine, to an Arab Christian family. At the age of four, he and his father narrowly escaped a bomb explosion during the 1947–1949 Palestine war. This incident, according to author Mel Ayton, "had a psychological effect on young Sirhan". He witnessed various other violent incidents during his childhood, including physical abuse by his father and the death of his older brother by a military truck that was trying to avoid sniper fire. In late 1956, Sirhan, along with his family, immigrated to the United States. He opposed immigration, saying that "the US was against the Arabs and was friendly with Israel, and a friend of my enemy is my enemy". Once in the United States, Sirhan received above-average grades and joined the officer cadet corps. During his late-teenage years, Sirhan's father abandoned the family, his sister died, two of his brothers were arrested, and he was expelled from Pasadena City College. Sirhan held strongly anti-Zionist and pro-Palestinian beliefs.

In 1966, while pursuing a career as a jockey, Sirhan fell from a running horse, suffering minor injuries. A friend of Sirhan said that after this incident, Sirhan was "impatient, nervous, emotional and always in a hurry". A diary was found during a search of his home, where he wrote on May 18: "Robert Kennedy must be assassinated ... My determination to eliminate RFK is becoming more and more of an unshakable obsession. RFK must die. RFK must be killed."

Investigation and trial 
Due to Sirhan being a non-citizen, it was illegal under California law for him to purchase firearms. He violated three California laws by possessing the pistol he used to kill Kennedy. Loren Coleman suggested that the date of the assassination is significant because it was the first anniversary of the start of the Six-Day War between Israel and its Arab neighbors.

When Sirhan was booked by police, they found in his pocket a newspaper article that discussed Kennedy's support for Israel; Sirhan later said that he began to hate Kennedy after learning of this support. Sirhan was convicted of Kennedy's murder in April 1969, and was sentenced to death. In 1972, the sentence was commuted to life in prison with the possibility of parole, after the California Supreme Court, in its ruling in California v. Anderson, invalidated as unconstitutional all pending death sentences that were imposed before 1972. In 1975, it was decided that Sirhan would be freed on parole in 1984. In 1982, however, the California Board of Prison Term rescinded the parole date, citing death threats made by Sirhan from prison. In 1989, Sirhan told David Frost in prison that his sole connection with Kennedy was "[Kennedy's] support of Israel and his deliberate attempt to send those 50 bombers to Israel to obviously do harm to the Palestinians." Although a study published in the Bulletin of the Atomic Scientists referred to Sirhan as a "withdrawn fanatic with multiple identity problems", the author James W. Clarke stated that Sirhan was more motivated by political issues than by his personal temperament. During the trial, Sirhan's lawyers attempted to use a defense of diminished responsibility, while Sirhan tried to confess to the crime and change his plea to guilty on several occasions. He testified that he had killed Kennedy "with 20 years of malice aforethought". As of 2022, Sirhan has been denied parole 16 times. His lawyers have claimed that he was framed, and he claims to have no memory of his crime.

In February 2012, Sirhan's lawyers William F. Pepper and Laurie Dusek filed a court brief in District Court in Los Angeles, claiming that a second gunman fired the shots that killed Kennedy. It was the fourth in a series of federal briefs filed under habeas corpus by Pepper and Dusek, beginning in October 2010. In 2015, Judge Beverly Reid O'Connell denied the petition. During Sirhan's 2016 parole hearing, Paul Schrade, who was shot and wounded on the assassination night, asserted that the fatal shot to Kennedy was by a different shooter. He claimed that the Los Angeles Police Department (LAPD) destroyed evidence, "hid ballistic evidence exonerating Sirhan, and covered up conclusive evidence that a second gunman fatally wounded Robert Kennedy." In August 2021, the California state parole panel recommended Sirhan's parole. Two of Kennedy's children, Robert F. Kennedy Jr. and Douglas Harriman Kennedy, supported the decision, while six others opposed it. Gavin Newsom, the governor of California, denied the parole in January 2022, asserting that "Sirhan has not developed the accountability and insight required to support his safe release into the community."

Conspiracy theories

CIA involvement hypothesis 
In November 2006, the BBC's Newsnight program presented research by filmmaker Shane O'Sullivan alleging that several Central Intelligence Agency (CIA) officers were present on the night of the assassination. The three men who appear in films and photographs from the night of the assassination were identified by former colleagues and associates as former senior CIA officers who had worked together in 1963 at JMWAVE, the CIA's anti-Castro station based in Miami. They were JMWAVE Chief of Operations David Morales, Chief of Maritime Operations Gordon Campbell, and Chief of Psychological Warfare Operations George Joannides. Several people who had known Morales were sure that he was not the man claimed by O'Sullivan. After O'Sullivan published his book, assassination researchers Jefferson Morley and David Talbot discovered that Campbell had died of a heart attack in 1962, six years before Kennedy's assassination. In response, O'Sullivan stated that the man on the video may have used Campbell's name as an alias.

Second gunman hypothesis 
The location of Kennedy's wounds suggested that his assailant had stood behind him, while some witnesses assert that Sirhan faced west as Kennedy moved through the pantry. Other witnesses said that Kennedy was turning to his left shaking hands as Sirhan approached, from the east.

In 1975, during a re-examination of the case, experts looked into the possibility of a second gunman, and concluded that there was little or no evidence to support this hypothesis. In 2004, CNN's senior writer Brad Johnson discovered a recording of Kennedy's victory speech, recorded by the Polish journalist . Johnson gave the tapes to the audio engineer Philip Van Praag, who analyzed and found 13 shots fired even though Sirhan's gun held only eight rounds. He also stated the recording revealed at least two cases where the timing between shots was shorter than physically possible from Sirhan's gun alone. Forensic audio specialists Wes Dooley and Paul Pegas of Audio Engineering Associates in Pasadena examined the findings and corroborated the presence of at least 10 shots on the tape along with an over-lapping shot.  Other acoustic experts have claimed that they could find no more than eight shots recorded on the audiotape. Critics claim that Van Praag misidentified the noise impulses of the recording as gun shots.

In 2008, eyewitness John Pilger asserted his belief that there must have been a second gunman.

Legacy 

Kennedy's assassination was one of the four major assassinations in the United States in the 1960s, the others being those of John F. Kennedy (1963), Malcolm X (1965), and Martin Luther King Jr. (1968). Some scholars view the assassination as one of the first major incidents of political violence in the United States stemming from the Arab–Israeli conflict in the Middle East.

Until 1987, the LAPD retained the original files, reports, transcripts, fragments of the bullets that struck Kennedy and the four other bystanders in the kitchen pantry, the .22 caliber Iver-Johnson handgun used by Sirhan, Kennedy's blood-stained clothes, and other artifacts related to the assassination. In 1987, the LAPD donated the entire evidence collection (except for Kennedy's clothes) to the California State Archives in Sacramento, for permanent preservation. Kennedy's blood-stained shirt, tie, and jacket are in the possession of the Los Angeles County District Attorney. In 2010, controversy arose when Kennedy's clothing was transported to the California Homicide Investigators Association conference in Las Vegas, where they were included in a temporary public display. Max Kennedy called it a "cheap bid for attention". The items and Kennedy's clothing were removed from the exhibit, with the LAPD apologizing to the Kennedy family.

The Robert F. Kennedy Assassination Archives of the University of Massachusetts Dartmouth contains a large collection of materials on the assassination. In 2006, American filmmaker Emilio Estevez wrote and directed the film Bobby. He attempted to recreate the scene of the assassination through a fictional account. According to the author Ron Briley, "the history in Bobby is often misleading".

See also 
 Kennedy curse
 List of assassinated American politicians

References

Notes

Works cited

Books

Scholarly articles

Magazines

News sources

Web sources

Further reading

External links 
 List of physical evidences at the assassination site — via the California State Archives
 Robert F. Kennedy Assassination 50th Anniversary — via C-SPAN
 Public Law 90-331 — via Govinfo.gov

 
1968 murders in the United States
Assassinations in the United States
Filmed assassinations
1968 United States presidential election
Terrorist incidents in Los Angeles
Deaths by firearm in California
Deaths by person in Los Angeles
Murder in Los Angeles
June 1968 events in the United States
1968 in Los Angeles
Terrorist incidents in the United States in 1968
Political violence in the United States